Stalden-Saas railway station is a railway station in the municipality of Stalden, in the Swiss canton of Valais. It is an intermediate stop on the  Brig–Zermatt line and is served by local trains only.

Services 
The following services stop at Stalden-Saas:

Film 
Stalden-Saas railway station appears in the 1979  Charles Bronson action film Love and Bullets. Bronson (as character Charlie Congers) and Jill Ireland (Jackie Pruit) disembark from a train and begin driving toward Kandersteg from the station carpark.

References

External links 
 
 

Railway stations in the canton of Valais
Matterhorn Gotthard Bahn stations